Windscribe is a commercial, cross-platform virtual private network (VPN) service provider that is based in Canada, but operates internationally.

History
Windscribe was founded by Yegor Sak and Alex Paguis in 2016.

In January 2021, Windscribe began beta testing ControlD, a new standalone DNS-based ad and tracker service, a direct competitor to services such as NextDNS.

Features
Windscribe uses the OpenVPN, Internet Key Exchange v2/IPsec, and WireGuard protocols in its applications and manual configurations. Windscribe servers support P2P file sharing and is promoted as a no-log VPN service from their privacy policy.

Windscribe has desktop applications for Windows and macOS, with a command-line utility for Linux, and mobile applications for iOS, Android, and Android TV. Windscribe also offers encrypted proxy support via browser extensions on Google Chrome and Firefox web browsers. Windscribe users can connect unlimited simultaneous devices.

2021 server seizure incident
On July 8, 2021, Windscribe disclosed that two VPN servers hosted in Ukraine were seized by local authorities on June 24, 2021. On the disk of the VPN servers contained an OpenVPN private key, which could have been used to impersonate a Windscribe VPN server and capture traffic running through it. Windscribe had failed to encrypt the servers in question, allowing for the retrieval of the private key. In addition, Windscribe ran servers with an OpenVPN feature that was deprecated since 2018, leaving the servers unencrypted and its users vulnerable.

See also
Comparison of virtual private network services
Encryption
Internet privacy
Secure communication
Virtual private network

References

Virtual private network services
Virtual private networks
Canadian companies established in 2016